Friedrich Wilhelm Bessel (22 July 1784 – 17 March 1846) was a German astronomer, mathematician, physicist, and geodesist. He was the first astronomer who determined reliable values for the distance from the sun to another star by the method of parallax. Certain important mathematical functions were named Bessel functions after Bessel's death, though they had originally been discovered by Daniel Bernoulli before being generalised by Bessel.

Life and family 

Bessel was born in Minden, Westphalia, then capital of the Prussian administrative region Minden-Ravensberg, as second son of a civil servant into a large family. At the age of 14 he left the school, because he did not like the education in latin language, and apprenticed in the import-export concern Kulenkamp at Bremen. The business's reliance on cargo ships led him to turn his mathematical skills to problems in navigation. This in turn led to an interest in astronomy as a way of determining longitude.

Bessel came to the attention of Heinrich Wilhelm Olbers, a practising physician of Bremen and well-known astronomer, by producing a refinement on the orbital calculations for Halley's Comet in 1804, using old observation data taken from Thomas Harriot and Nathaniel Torporley in 1607. Franz Xaver von Zach edited the results in his journal Monatliche Correspondenz.

Having finished his commercial education Bessel left Kulenkamp in 1806 and became assistant at Johann Hieronymus Schröter's private observatory in Lilienthal near Bremen as successor of Karl Ludwig Harding. There he worked on James Bradley's stellar observation data to produce precise positions for some 3,222 stars.

Despite lacking any higher education, especially at university, Bessel was appointed director of the newly founded Königsberg Observatory by King Frederick William III of Prussia in January 1810, at the age of 25, and remained in that position until his death. By reason of lacking any academical degree some colleagues of the Philosophical Faculty disputed Bessel's right to teach mathematics. Therefore he turned to his fellow Carl Friedrich Gauss, who provided the award of an honorary doctor degree from the University of Göttingen in March 1811. Both scientists were in correspondence from 1804 to 1843. In 1837 they got in quarrel about Gauss' habit of very slow publication.

In 1842 Bessel took part in the annual meeting of the British Association for the Advancement of Science in Manchester, accompanied by the geophysicist Georg Adolf Erman and the mathematician Carl Gustav Jacob Jacobi, where he gave a report of astronomical clocks.

Bessel married Johanna Hagen, the daughter of the chemist and pharmacist Karl Gottfried Hagen who was the uncle of the physician and biologist Hermann August Hagen and the hydraulic engineer Gotthilf Hagen, the latter also Bessel's student and assistant from 1816 to 1818. The physicist Franz Ernst Neumann, Bessel's close companion and colleague, was married to Johanna Hagen's sister Florentine. Neumann introduced Bessel's exacting methods of measurement and data reduction into his mathematico-physical seminar, which he co-directed with Carl Gustav Jacob Jacobi at Königsberg. These exacting methods had a lasting impact upon the work of Neumann's students and upon the Prussian conception of precision in measurement.

Bessel had two sons and three daughters. His elder son became an architect but died suddenly in 1840 aged 26; his younger son died shortly after birth. His eldest daughter, Marie, married the physicist Georg Adolf Erman, member of the scholar family Erman. One of their sons in turn was the renowned Egyptologist Adolf Erman. His third daughter Johanna married the politician Adolf Hermann Hagen; their son was the physicist Ernst Bessel Hagen and the mathematician Erich Bessel-Hagen was a grandson of them. Bessel was godfather of Adolf von Baeyer, son of his collaborator Johann Jacob Baeyer.

After several months of illness Bessel died in March 1846 at his observatory from retroperitoneal fibrosis.

Work 

While the observatory was still in construction Bessel elaborated the Fundamenta Astronomiae based on Bradley's observations. As a preliminary result he produced tables of atmospheric refraction that won him the Lalande Prize from the French Academy of Sciences in 1811. The Königsberg Observatory began operation in 1813.

Starting in 1819, Bessel determined the position of over 50,000 stars using a meridian circle from Reichenbach, assisted by some of his qualified students. The most prominent of them was Friedrich Wilhelm Argelander, his successors were Otto August Rosenberger and August Ludwig Busch.

With this work done, Bessel was able to achieve the feat for which he is best remembered today: he is credited with being the first to use the stellar parallax in calculating the distance to a star. Astronomers had believed for some time that parallax would provide the first accurate measurement of interstellar distances. In 1838 Bessel announced that 61 Cygni had a parallax of 0.314 arcseconds; which, given the diameter of the Earth's orbit, indicated that the star is 10.3 ly away.  Given the current measurement of 11.4 ly, Bessel's figure had an error of 9.6%. 
Thanks to these results astronomers had not only enlarged the vision of the universe well beyond the cosmic magnitude, but after the discovery in 1728 by James Bradley of the aberration of light a second empirical evidence of the Earth's relative movement was produced. Short time later Friedrich Georg Wilhelm Struve and Thomas Henderson reported the parallaxes of Vega and Alpha Centauri.

As well as helping determine the parallax of 61 Cygni, Bessel's precise measurements using a new meridian circle from Adolf Repsold allowed him to notice deviations in the motions of Sirius and Procyon, which he deduced must be caused by the gravitational attraction of unseen companions.
His announcement of Sirius's "dark companion" in 1844 was the first correct claim of a previously unobserved companion by positional measurement, and eventually led to the discovery of Sirius B.

Bessel was the first scientist who realized the effect later called personal equation, that several simultaneously observing persons determine slightly different values, especially recording the transition time of stars.

In 1824, Bessel developed a new method for calculating the circumstances of eclipses using the so-called Besselian elements.  His method simplified the calculation to such an extent, without sacrificing accuracy, that it is still in use today.

On Bessel's proposal in 1825 the Prussian Academy of Sciences started the edition of the Berliner Akademische Sternkarten (Berlin Academic Star Charts) as an international project with Johann Franz Encke as executive editor. One unpublished new chart enabled Johann Gottfried Galle to find Neptune near the position calculated by Le Verrier in September 1846 at Berlin Observatory.

In the second decade of the 19th century while studying the dynamics gravitational systems as multi-body problem, Bessel developed what are now known as Bessel functions. Critical for the solution of certain differential equations, these functions are used throughout both classical and quantum physics.

Bessel is responsible for the correction to the formula for the sample variance estimator named in his honour. This is the use of the factor n − 1 in the denominator of the formula, rather than just n. This occurs when the sample mean rather than the population mean is used to centre the data and since the sample mean is a linear combination of the data the residual to the sample mean overcounts the number of degrees of freedom by the number of constraint equations — in this case one. (Also see Bessel's correction).

Like numerous astronomers of his time Bessel dealt on the field of geodesy, too,
first theoretically, when he published a method for solving the main geodetic problem.
In 1830 he got the royal order for the survey of East Prussia with the purpose to connect the yet existing Prussian and Russian triangulation networks. This work was carried out in cooperation with Johann Jacob Baeyer, then major of the Prussian army; the final report was published in 1838.
He also obtained an estimate of increased accuracy for the Earth's ellipsoid, nowadays called the Bessel ellipsoid, based on several arc measurements.

Honors and prizes 
 Honorary doctor degree from the University of Göttingen in March 1811 
 Member of the Prussian Academy of Sciences in 1812
 Member of the French Academy of Sciences in 1816
 Foreign member of the Royal Swedish Academy of Sciences in 1823
 Fellow of the Royal Society in 1825
 Foreign Honorary Member of the American Academy of Arts and Sciences in 1832
 Member of the Royal Institute of the Netherlands, predecessor of the Royal Netherlands Academy of Arts and Sciences in 1827
 Member of the American Philosophical Society in 1840
 Bessel won the Gold Medal of the Royal Astronomical Society twice, in 1829 and 1841.

The largest crater in the Moon's Mare Serenitatis and the main-belt asteroid 1552 Bessel, as well as two fjords in Greenland, Bessel Fjord, NE Greenland and Bessel Fjord, NW Greenland, were named in his honour.

Publications 

Latin

 
 

German

 
 
 
 
 
 
 
 
 
 
 Vol. 1: I. Bewegungen der Körper im Sonnensystem. II. Sphärische Astronomie. Leipzig 1875
 Vol. 2: III. Theorie der Instrumente. IV. Stellarastronomie. V. Mathematik. Leipzig 1876
 Vol. 3: VI. Geodäsie. VII. Physik. VIII. Verschiedenes – Literatur. Leipzig 1876.
 

Correspondence
 Königlich Preußische Akademie der Wissenschaften, ed. (1880): Briefwechsel zwischen Gauss und Bessel. [Correspondence] Leipzig.

See also 

 List of things named after Friedrich Bessel

References 

 John Frederick William Herschel, A brief notice of the life, researches, and discoveries of Friedrich Wilhelm Bessel, London: Barclay, 1847 (on-line)
 
 Jürgen Hamel: Friedrich Wilhelm Bessel. Leipzig 1984 .
 Kasimir Ławrynowicz: Friedrich Wilhelm Bessel, 1784–1846. Basel, Boston, Berlin 1995, .
 
 
 Publications of Friedrich Wilhelm Bessel Astrophysics Data System ADS

Further reading

External links 

 

1784 births
1846 deaths
19th-century German mathematicians
Fellows of the American Academy of Arts and Sciences
Foreign Members of the Royal Society
19th-century German astronomers
German geodesists
Honorary members of the Saint Petersburg Academy of Sciences
Members of the French Academy of Sciences
Members of the Royal Netherlands Academy of Arts and Sciences
People from Minden
People from East Prussia
People from the Kingdom of Prussia
Recipients of the Gold Medal of the Royal Astronomical Society
Recipients of the Lalande Prize
Recipients of the Pour le Mérite (civil class)
Members of the Göttingen Academy of Sciences and Humanities